Richard Smothermon is a current Oklahoma Pardon and Parole Board member and former District Attorney in Oklahoma.

Career before parole board 
Smothermon "of Edmond, served 16 years as district attorney for Pottawatomie and Lincoln counties before being tapped to serve as general counsel for the Oklahoma State Bureau of Investigation." He retired in May 2021. He was the 2010 "incumbent from District 23 that includes Pottawatomie and Lincoln Counties" who faced "a challenge by former district attorney Bill Roberson. Roberson, 66, served as district attorney for District 23 from 1983 until 1991." Smothermon was 44 years old when he sought reelection.

In 2015, Smothermon handled a report from the Oklahoma State Bureau of Investigations "on whether a Shawnee City Commissioner tried to bribe another commissioner." In 2018, Smothermon ruled that a "U.S. Marshal and an Oklahoma drug agent involved in the fatal shooting of a prison escapee were both justified in using deadly force." In 2019, he was involved in the "agreement regarding approximately 20 acres of land known as the Mission Hill property. Pottawatomie County Commissioners conveyed the property to Citizen Potawatomi Nation."

Parole board 
In 2021, Richard Smothermon replaced Comanche County Judge Allen McCall on the pardon and parole board. McCall had "been on the Board since 2017, and had been openly oppositional to reform efforts, as well as to former Pardon and Parole Board Director Steve Bickley." McCall, as well as Smothermon, were appointed by the Oklahoma Supreme Court." Smothermon was the sole former-DA on the board until he was later followed by a second former-DA in 2022, Cathy Stocker, appointed by Governor Kevin Stitt. The Governor's choice of another former district attorney came "in an election year as Stitt is being accused in TV attack ads of being soft on crime." The ads "focus on how many prisoners have been released through commutations recommended by the parole board." Lawrence Paul Anderson's commuted sentence, approved by the governor, is one example of a case being used in attacks on the board and governor, but Smothermon "was not on the board when Anderson’s sentence was commuted." The Board took criticisms from current DAs like Steve Kunzweiler, who want the board to be more conservative in their considerations for parole and commutation. In the Tulsa World, DAs were also blamed for taking an increasingly more political role that has "to some degree weakened" the board's influence.

In 2021, Smothermon voted against clemency for Julius Jones.  Smothermon's concern focused on a recent “misconduct” violation Jones received while in prison. In 2022,  he voted against giving April Wilkens a parole hearing. However, the board recommended the Crossbow Killer, Jimmie Stohler, be granted a full parole recommendation in the same meeting. Smothermon had voted to deny clemency to every death row inmate until August 2022, except for Richard Glossip, where Smothermon recused himself due to his wife being the prosecutor on the case. On August 3, 2022, Smothermon voted for clemency on his first death row inmate for James Coddington.

See also 

 List of district attorneys by county
 Oklahoma Pardon and Parole Board
 Richard Glossip
 Cathy Stocker 
 Edward J. Konieczny 
 Larry Morris

References 

Living people
21st-century American lawyers
Year of birth missing (living people)
District attorneys in Oklahoma